National sports teams of England is an incomplete list of sports teams representing England.

English representative teams

Multi-sport events

Commonwealth Games
The team is sent by the Commonwealth Games Council for England to represent England in Commonwealth Games multiple times: 
2010, 
2006, 
2002, 
1998, 
1994 and in 
1962 (event known as British Empire and Commonwealth Games).

A similar team has sent by the Commonwealth Games Council for England to represent England at the Commonwealth Youth Games.

Football codes
Australian rules football, England National Australian Rules team
Futsal, England national futsal team

Association football
England men's national football team
England women's national football team
England national under-21 football team
England national under-19 football team
England B national football team
England C national football team

Rugby league
 England national rugby league team
 England women's national rugby league team

Rugby union
England national rugby union team
England women's national rugby union team

Rugby sevens
England national rugby sevens team
England women's national rugby sevens team

Beach Soccer
England national beach soccer team
England women's national beach soccer team

Batting sport
Badminton, England national badminton team
Baseball, England national baseball team

Cricket
England national cricket team
England national women's cricket team
England U19 cricket team
England Lions cricket team
England national blind cricket team
England national deaf cricket team

Racquet sport
 Tennis, England national tennis team

Squash
England men's national squash team
England women's national squash team

Stick sport
Bandy, England national bandy team
Roller hockey, England national roller hockey team
Shinty, English national shinty team

Field hockey
England men's national field hockey team
England women's national field hockey team

Lacrosse
England men's national lacrosse team
England women's national lacrosse team

Other sport
Cycling, England national cycling team
Kabaddi, England national kabaddi team
Korfball, England national korfball team
Netball, England national netball team
Quadball, England national quadball team
Roller derby, Team England (roller derby)

Basketball
England national basketball team
England women's national basketball team

Curling
England men's national curling team
England women's national curling team

See also
 Sport in England
 Great Britain at the Olympics

References

 List
England sport-related lists
Sport